Agricola, the Latin word for farmer, may also refer to:

People

Cognomen or given name
In chronological order
 Gnaeus Julius Agricola (40–93), Roman governor of Britannia (AD 77–85)
 Sextus Calpurnius Agricola, Roman governor of the mid–2nd century AD
 Agricola (consul 421) (365–?), Western Roman statesman
 Agricola (vir inlustris), son of the Western Roman Emperor Avitus
 Saints Vitalis and Agricola (died 304), martyrs 
 Agricola of Avignon (c. 630–c. 700), bishop of Avignon and saint
 Saint Agricola of Nevers (died 594), bishop of Nevers

Surname
In alphabetical order
 Adam Christian Agricola (1593–1645), evangelical preacher
 Alexander Agricola (1446–1506), Franco-Flemish composer of the Renaissance
 Christoph Ludwig Agricola (1667–1719), German landscape painter
 Georg Andreas Agricola (1672–1738), German physician and naturalist
 Georg Ludwig Agricola (1643–1676), German composer
 Georgius Agricola (1494–1555), German scholar and scientist, and the 'father of mineralogy'
 Ignaz Agricola (1661–1729), German Jesuit
 Ilka Agricola (born 1973), German mathematician
 Johann Friedrich Agricola (1720–1774), German composer
 Johannes Agricola (1494–1566), German scholar and theologian, an antinomian
 Karl Agricola (1779–1852), German painter
 Kurt Agricola (1889–1955), German World War II general
 Martin Agricola (1486–1556), German composer and music theorist of the Renaissance
 Mikael Agricola (1510–1557), Finnish theologian and reformer
 Peter Agricola (1525–1585), German Renaissance humanist, educator, classical scholar, theologian and diplomat
 Philipp Agricola (fl. 1571–1594), German poet and dramatist
 Rodolphus Agricola (1443–1485), Dutch scholar and humanist
 Stephan Agricola, also Kastenpaur (1491–1547), German scholar and theologian, formerly an Augustinian monk

Pen name
 John Young (merchant) (1773–1837), merchant, author and political figure in Nova Scotia who wrote under the name Agricola

Places in the United States
Agricola, Florida, a former company town
Agricola, Georgia, an unincorporated community
Agricola, Kansas, an unincorporated community
Agricola, Mississippi, an unincorporated community

Other uses
Agricola (book), a biography of Julius Agricola by Tacitus
AGRICOLA, a database of scientific papers
Agricola (vehicles), a Greek truck manufacturer
Agricola (board game), a 2007 board game by Uwe Rosenberg
3212 Agricola, an asteroid
Auster Agricola, an aircraft from the 1950s
Agricola (school), a secret NCO school operated by the Szare Szeregi during World War II
Agricola Street, a prominent street in the North End of Halifax, Nova Scotia
A series of commemorative medals issued by the Food and Agriculture Organization.

See also
Agricola's Ditch

Masculine given names